is a series of fighting video game developed by AKI Corporation, based on the popular Kinnikuman manga and anime series from Weekly Shonen Jump.

Muscle Grand Prix

It includes 16 wrestlers, and 11 stages.

Muscle Grand Prix Max

It is the home version of the arcade game. It includes 17 extra characters (33 total) and 4 stages (15 total) over the arcade game, and adds story mode (based on the Seven Devil Chojin and the Golden Mask arcs), tournament mode (4, 8, or 16 characters), 5 vs 5 team mode, survival mode.

Early order includes a full color plastic "Meat" money box.

Game modes
Arcade (アーケード)
Single player 7 stages mode where the user choose one character and must defeat the last boss, which can be Akuma Shogun, Goldman or Benkiman.
Versus (バーサス)
Head-to-head two players mode where the challenger can select the stage.
Story (ストーリー)
The Seven Devil Chojin chapter (七人の悪魔超人編): "to be continued..."
The Gold Mask chapter (黄金のマスク編): "the end"
A 2-part scenario based, single player mode where the user plays as Suguru (Kinnikuman) and his allies (featuring a near-complete cast revival from the original anime). In the first chapter, Kinnikuman must defeat the six Devil Chojin led by Buffaloman in order to save Meat (ミート). In the second one, Suguru and his fellowship fight versus the Devil Knights to get back the stolen Gold Mask. Depending on the player's choices and his ability to follow the original manga's storyline (who-fight-who), he will be able - or not - to truly complete the mode and to watch the ending credits.
Tournament (トーナメント)
Challenge Tournament (チャレンジ・トーナメント)
Muscle Tournament (マッスル・トーナメント)
Ultimate Tournament (アルティメット・トーナメント)
The Challenge class is a 4-fighter series where the player has to beat 2 of them to be classified as "S" (Gold), "A" (Silver), "B" (Bronze) rank. Being defeated by one of them will result in a game over with a "D" (purple colored medal) rank. The Muscle class is an 8-fighter series where the player has to beat 3 of them to be classified as "S" (Gold), "A" (Silver), "B" (Bronze) rank. Being defeated by one of them will result in a game over with a "D" (purple colored medal) rank. The Ultimate Tournament is a 16-fighter series where the player has to beat 4 of them to be classified as "S" (Gold), "A" (Silver), "B" (Bronze) rank. Being defeated by one of them will result in a game over with a "D" (purple colored medal) rank.
Team Battle (団体戦, Dantaisen)
Versus Battle (対戦, Taisen)
1P VS CPU
CPU VS 2P
Watch Battle (観戦, Kansen)
A single, or two-player, 1on1 mode where the user choose five characters and have to defeat the other side. The challenger select the stage after each match. Each team can select the same character two times, as long as the double will use the alternate costume (which can be a different character). The "Watch Battle" mode allows the user to watch two CPU controlled characters fighting with each other.
Survival (サバイバル)
An endurance mode where the player select a character and have to win as much single round (1 minute max) fights as possible. 
Option (オプション)
Various adjustable settings such as Autosave feature, rounds number, controller key edit and damage percentage.

Muscle Grand Prix 2

This addition added 6 new characters.

Muscle Grand Prix 2 Tokumori

It is an expanded version of MGP2.

Extra game mode over the arcade game includes Tournament, Collection, Practice, Special.

In collection, a player can view galleries unlocked by performing certain techniques. Silver medal only unlocks greyscale image, while gold medal unlocks colour image.  The type of medal attained is based on how accurately the techniques performed and the stage they are performed in mimic scenes from the anime (for example, silver is given for the correct move, but the wrong outfits or wrong stage, and gold is given for the correct move and the correct outfits in the correct stage).

In special, player can play the NES Kinnikuman games Muscle Tag Match and Scramble for the Throne.

Characters
A black star (★) represents characters who first appear in Muscle Grand Prix MAX. Player 2 costumes are in (brackets). New costumes in Muscle Grand Prix 2 are in ""

Justice Chojin

Legends
Kinnikuman (Kinniku Clan Battle Style) 
power: 950,000 / height: 185 cm / weight: 90 kg / homeland: Planet Kinniku
Finishing Hold: Complete Muscle Spark, Fart Spark (Incomplete Muscle Spark)
Terryman (2nd Kinnikuman Great) 
power: 950,000 / height: 190 cm / weight: 95 kg / homeland: Amarillo, Texas
Finishing Hold: Texas Clover Hold, Calf Branding
Robin Mask (Anime color) 
power: 960,000 / height: 217 cm / weight: 155 kg / homeland: England
Finishing Hold: Robin Special, Ropework Tower Bridge
Warsman (Chloé) 
power: 1,000,000 / height: 210 cm / weight: 150 kg / homeland: Soviet Union
Finishing Hold: Pallo Special The End, Double Claw Screw Driver
Ramenman (Mongolman)  
power: 970,000 / height: 208 cm / weight: 130 kg / homeland: Henan, China
Finishing Hold: Kowloon Wall Drop, Flying Leg Lariat
Brocken Jr. (Anime color) 
power: 900,000 / height: 195 cm / weight: 90 kg / homeland: Germany
Finishing Hold: Red Rain of Berlin, Continuous Red Rain of Berlin
Wolfman (Black mawashi)
power: 800,000 / height: 190 cm / weight: 120 kg / homeland: Tohoku, Japan
Finishing Hold: Gasshou Hineri, Nekodamashi
Pentagon (Black body)
power: 700,000 / height: 208 cm / weight: 115 kg / homeland: U.S.A.
Finishing Hold: Space Rush, Stop the Time
Benkiman (Anime version)
power: 400,000 / height: ? / weight: ? / homeland: Ancient Inca
Finishing Hold: Dreaded Benki Flush, Dreaded Ben...?
★Geronimo (Manga color)
power: 830,000 / height: 180 cm / weight: 80 kg / homeland: Cherokee Reserves, Oklahoma
Finishing Hold: Apache War Cry, Tomohawk Chop Storm
★Kinnikuman Soldier (Anime color)
power: 1,080,000 / height: ? / weight: ? / homeland: Planet Kinniku
Finishing Hold: Napalm Stretch, Ataru's Muscle Spark

New Generation
Kinniku Mantaro (Chojin Olympics Costume)
power: 930,000 / height: 176 cm / weight: 83 kg / homeland: Planet Kinniku
Finishing Hold: Muscle Gravity, Muscle Millennium
Kevin Mask (Black mask and armor)
power: 1,170,000 / height: 218 cm / weight: 155 kg / homeland: London, England
Finishing Hold: Big Ben Edge, Provocation Toe Kick
★Terry the Kid (Ultimate Chojin Tag Arc Costume)
power: 1,050,000 / height: 190 cm / weight: 86 kg / homeland: Texas
Finishing Hold: Texas Clover Hold, Calf Branding
★Jade (No helmet)
power: 950,000 / height: 183 cm / weight: 93 kg / homeland: Germany
Finishing Hold: Double Red Rain of Berlin, Beefcake Hammer
★Scarface (Overbody)
power: 1,380,000 / height: 200 cm / weight: 137 kg / homeland: Italy
Finishing Hold: Ultimate Scar Buster, Hell River Plunge
★Check Mate (Black outfit)
power: 1,210,000 / height: 221 cm / weight: 190~800 kg / homeland: Monaco
Finishing Hold: Grand Slam - Stallion Style Honorable Driver, Grand Slam - Human Desk Drop Bomb
★Ilioukhine (Light blue body)
power: 1,200,000 / height: 227 cm / weight: 176 kg / homeland: Russia
Finishing Hold: The Turbulence, Genetic Storm
★Barrierfreeman (Yellow diaper)
power: 420,000 / height: 183 cm / weight: 78 kg / homeland: Sweden
Finishing Hold: Narayama Backbreaker, Nils' Narayama Backbreaker

Devil Choujins

7 Devil Choujins Arc
Buffaloman (Possessed by Satan version) 
power: 10,000,000 / height: 250 cm / weight: 220 kg / homeland: Spain
Finishing Hold: Hurricane Mixer "Course of Death", Hurricane Cross Slam
★Springman (Gold body)
power: 3,200,000 / height: ? / weight: ? / homeland: Greece
Finishing Hold: Devil Slinky, Spring Rocket
★Stecasse-King (Anime version)
power: 2,500,000 / height: ? / weight: ? / homeland: Belgium
Finishing Hold: Hell's Symphony, Für Elise
★Black Hole (Black and white costume)
power: 2,000,000 / height: 201 cm / weight: 420 kg / homeland: Bermuda Triangle
Finishing Hold: Black Hole Absorption, Shadow Clone Execution
★The Mountain (Blue dogi)
power: 500,000 / height: ? / weight: ? / homeland: Everest, Nepal
Finishing Hold: Mountain Drop, Full Body Mountain Drop
★Mister Khamen (Anime color)
power: 1,300,000 / height: ? / weight: ? / homeland: Egypt
Finishing Hold: Mummy Package, Mysterious Light Beam
★Atlantis (Navy blue)
power: 1,450,000 / height: ? / weight: ? / homeland: Australia
Finishing Hold: Atlantis Driver, Devil Choujin Blood Bind

Golden Mask Arc
Akuma Shogun (Goldman)
power: 15,000,000 / height: 220 cm / weight: 162 kg / homeland: Celestial Realm
Finishing Hold: Hell's Guillotine, Hell's Double Play
Ashuraman (Dream Chojin Tag Arc version & manga color) 
power: 10,000,000 / height: 203 cm / weight: 200 kg / homeland: Demon Realm
Finishing Hold: Improved Ashura Buster, Ashura Infinity Power
Sunshine (Dream Chojin Tag Arc version (New Sunshine))
power: 7,000,000 / height: 300 cm / weight: 1000 kg / homeland: Peru, (Nazca)
Finishing Hold: Demon Realm Hell Tour, Cursed Roller
The Ninja (Anime color)
power: 3,600,000 / height: 190 cm / weight: 115 kg / homeland: Japan
Finishing Hold: Goka Urin no Jutsu (Fiery Feather Ring Jutsu), Kumoito Shibari (Binding Spider Web)
★Junkman (Anime color)
power: 6,000,000 / height: ? / weight: ? / homeland: Australia
Finishing Hold: Blood Bath Hell, Double Face Junk Crush
★Planetman (Anime color)
power: 5,000,000 / height: ? / weight: ? / homeland: North Pole
Finishing Hold: Planetary Alignment, Grand Cross
★Sneagator (Light brown)
power: 4,000,000 / height: ? / weight: ? / homeland: Congo region
Finishing Hold: Hell's Space Walk "Ultra C", Hell's Seal

Muscle Grand Prix 2 characters
Kinnikuman Super Phoenix (Purple face lines)
power: 100,000,000 / height: 190 cm / weight: 114 kg / homeland: Planet Kinniku
Finishing Hold: True Muscle Revenger, Raging Ox
Kinnikuman Zebra ("Zangyaku Chojin" Mode)
power: 100,000,000 / height: 220 cm / weight: 154 kg / homeland: Namibia
Finishing Hold: Saint Muscle Punch, Muscle Inferno
Kinnikuman Mariposa (Anime color)
power: 100,000,000 / height: 185 cm / weight: 100 kg / homeland: Mexico
Finishing Hold: Phony Muscle Revenger, Aztec Rush
Kinnikuman Big Body(Anime color)
power: 100,000,000 / height: 245 cm / weight: 215 kg / homeland: Canada
Finishing Hold: Muscle Impact, Maple Leaf Clutch

+ The Hell Missionaries
Neptuneman (Anime color)
power: 28,000,000 / height: 240 cm / weight: 210 kg / homeland: England
Finishing Hold: Cross Bomber, Double Leg Suplex
Big the Budou (Anime color, Neptune King)
power: 50,000,000 / height: 290 cm / weight: 320 kg / homeland: Japan
Finishing Hold: Megaton King Drop, Cross Bomber

Stage list
 Beverly Park (美波理(ビバリー)公園, Bibarii Kouen)
 Five Story Ring (五重のリング, Go-e no Ringu)
 Tokyo Tower Special Ring (東京タワー特設リング, Tōkyō Tawā Tokusetsu Ringu)
 Hidden Pond in Ueno Park (上野公園不忍池, Ueno Kouen Shinobazuno Ike)
 Demon Womb (デーモン・ウゥーム, Demon Wuum)
 Amusement Park (遊園地, Yuuenchi)
 Denen Colosseum (田園コロシアム, Denen Koroshiamu)
 Chichibu Mountain Range (秩父連山, Chichibu Renzan)
 Nippon Budokan (日本武道館, Nippon Budoukan)
 Japanese Alps (日本アルプス, Nippon Arupusu)
 Tournament Mountain (トーナメント・マウンテン, Tōnamento Maunten)
Muscle Grand Prix MAX
 Tottori Sand Dunes (鳥取砂丘, Tottori Sakyuu)
 Hokkaidō UFO Landing Zone (北海道UFO発着所, Hokkaidou UFO Hatchakujo)
 Korakuen Baseball Stadium (後楽園球場, Kourakuen Kyuujou)
 Spirit World Pocket (霊界ポケット, Reikai Poketto)
Muscle Grand Prix 2
 Osaka Castle (大阪城, Oosaka-jou)
 Cube Ring (立方体リング, Rippoutai Ringu)
 Fist of Heracles (ヘラクレスの拳, Herakuresu no Ken)

Theme list
Opening Theme: Honoo no Kinnikuman (炎のキン肉マン, Blazing Kinnikuman) by Akira Kushida
Ending Theme: Kinnikuman Go Fight! (キン肉マンGo Fight!) by Akira Kushida
Insert Theme: Miracle of Muscle Docking. (Plays if you use certain characters against each other from Kinnikuman)
Insert Theme: Hustle Muscle. (Plays if you use certain characters against each other in Kinnikuman Nisei)

Reception
MGP Max was rated 32/40 (Silver rank) by (Weekly Famitsu).

Voice cast
Akira Kamiya as Kinnikuman
Konami Yoshida as Meat-kun, Silver Mask, Choujin Child
Hideyuki Tanaka as Terryman, Springman, Planetman
Daisuke Gōri as Robin Mask, Black Hole, Ashuraman
Hideyuki Hori as Warsman
Kenichi Ono as Ramenman/Mongolman, Specialman
Yasuhiko Kawazu as Brocken Jr., Wolfman, Barrierfreeman (Nils)
Mahito Ohba as Geronimo, Planet Kinniku Soldier
Kenji Nomura as Buffaloman, Scarface
Ryōichi Tanaka as Mister Kamen
Issei Futamata as Benkiman, SteCase King, Sneagator, Silverman
Masaharu Satō as Sunshine, Mariposa, Chairman Harabote, Kinniku Clan Ancestor
Kōji Totani as Pentagon, Announcer, Canadianman
Tetsu Inada as Akuma Shogun
Hiroaki Hirata as The Ninja
Kazuhiko Kishino as Atlantis, Junkman, Neptuneman, Doctor
Yonehiko Kitagawa as The Mountain, Big the Budo, Golden Mask, Kami-sama
Shigeru Chiba as Kinniku Ataru
Michihiro Ikemizu as Super Phoenix
Hirohiko Kakegawa as Zebra
Masato Hirano as Big Body
Masaya Onosaka as Kinniku Mantarou
Ryōtarō Okiayu as Kevin Mask
Toshiyuki Morikawa as Terry the Kid
Kenji Nojima as Jade
Bin Shimada as Barrierfreeman (Jiijoman)
Kouichi Toochika as Check Mate, Ilioukhine
Kōzō Shioya as King Kinniku
Sanae Takagi as Bibinba
Naoki Tatsuta as Nakano-san/Narration
Lenne Hardt as System Voice (Game Announcer)

See also
Kinnikuman characters
Kinnikuman Generations

References

External links
Kinnikuman Muscle Grand Prix Official Site
Kinnikuman Muscle Grand Prix MAX Official Site
Kinnikuman Muscle Grand Prix 2 Official Site
Kinnikuman Muscle Grand Prix 2 Special Edition Official Site

2006 video games
Arcade video games
Bandai games
Kinnikuman games
PlayStation 2 games
Professional wrestling games
Shueisha franchises
Syn Sophia games
Fighting games
Video games developed in Japan